Joan Perucho Gutiérrez  (Barcelona, 7 November 1920 – Barcelona, 28 October 2003) was a Spanish novelist, poet and art critic, an activity that alternated with his profession as a judge. His work, written in Catalan and Spanish mix with other traditional elements of avant-garde and science fiction that endow great originality. Natural Stories is his best known work.

He is one of the most prominent figures in fantasy literature on the Iberian Peninsula, where he introduced H.P. Lovecraft. His best-known book, Les històries naturals (1960), is a hilarious vampire story. Published in English as Natural History in 1992 and later translated into a handful of other languages, and was included by Harold Bloom in The Western Canon.

Beyond the literary work, Perucho created a fascinating character: erudite (but fond of mixing inventions with historical information), very ironic, passionate and exuberant. Judge by profession, he exercised his profession in small towns, to be able to work on books and articles. This took him from Barcelona to La Granadella, Banyoles, Móra d’Ebre, Gandesa and Tortosa. He wrote about the landscapes of the south, about Mediterranean Catalonia and about the Spain of the Visigothic period and the Cortes of Cádiz. Perucho's work is an invitation to pleasure, fun and reading.

As for his poetic work, written entirely in Catalan, Perucho approached symbolist poetry, which he mixed with surrealist influences.

Awards 
In recognition of his work, Joan Perucho was awarded the Creu de Sant Jordi (1991), the Premi Nacional de Cultura (1995), the Rosalía de Castro Award (1996), the Medal of Artistic Merit of Barcelona City Council (2001), the Premio Nacional de las Letras Españolas (2002) and the National Prize of the Spanish Association of Fantasy and Science Fiction (2002). He was awarded an Honorary Doctorate by the Rovira i Virgili University on 10 November 1995.

Works 

 Narrative
 1953: Diana i la mar morta
 1956: Amb la tècnica de Lovecraft
 1957: Llibre de cavalleries
 1960: Les històries naturals
 1963: Galería de espejos sin fondo
 1965: Roses, diables i somriures
 1968: Nicéforas y el grifo
 1968: Aparicions i fantasmes
 1969: Botànica oculta o el fals Paracels 
 1972: Historias secretas de balnearios
 1974: Històries apòcrifes
 1975: Els balnearis
 1976: Monstruari fantàstic
 1981: Les aventures del cavaller Kosmas
 1981: Museu d'ombres
 1981: Petit museu de monstres marins
 1981: Gàbia per a petits animals feliços. (Quaderns Crema)
 1982: Discurs de l'Aquitània i altres refinades perversitats. (Quaderns Crema)
 1983: Incredulitats i devocions
 1983: Pamela
 1984: Les delicies de l'oci
 1984: Los laberintos bizantinos o un viaje con espectros
 1984: Un viatge amb espectres. (Quaderns Crema)
 1985: Dietario apócrifo de Octavio de Romeu
 1986: La guerra de la Cotxinxina
 1986: Roses, diables i somriures
 1987: Minuta de mostruos
 1988: Los misterios de Barcelona
 1989: Els emperadors d'Abissínia
 1990: Detrás del espejo
 1990: El basilisc
 1990: Algú a la nit respira
 1990: Els fantasmes de la calaixera
 1994: El baró de Maldà i les bèsties de l'infern
 1995: Las sombras del mundo
 1996: Fabulaciones
 1997: Obres completes 1985–1997
 2001: Carmina o la gnosi angélica
 2001: Història d'un retrat
 2001: La darrera mirada

 Poetry
 1947: Sota la sang
 1951: Aurora per vosaltres
 1953: El mèdium
 1956: El país de les meravelles
 1970: Antología poética
 1978: Poesia 1947–1973
 1982: Poesía 1947–1981 (bilingüe)
 1983: Quadern d'Albinyana. (Quaderns Crema)
 1984: Obra poética completa
 1985: Itineraris d'Orient
 1986: Els miralls
 1987: La medusa
 1988: El duque de Portland sale a la calle
 1989: Cendres i diamants
 1993: Inscripcions, làpides, esteles
 1994: Els dies de la Sicília i la Germànica
 1995: Un silencio olvidado: poesía (1943–1947). (Quaderns Crema)
 1995: Versos d'una tardor
 1997: El far
 1998: La mirada d'Antinea
 2000: Els morts

 Essay
 1968: Miró, les essències de la terra
 1985: Teoria de Catalunya
 1986: Una semàntica visual
 1990: Monstres i erudicions
 1991: Cultura i imatge
 1993: La gespa contra el cel, notes de viatge
 1994: Picasso, el cubisme i Horta de Sant Joan
 1998: Els secrets de Circe
 1998: Estética del gusto 
 1998: La meva visió del món, 2 volums
 1999: Gastronomia i cultura
 1999: La porta de la identitat

References 

 Joan Perucho at LletrA, Catalan Literature Online (Open University of Catalonia).

1920 births
2003 deaths
Writers from Barcelona
Poets from Catalonia
20th-century judges